Subha is the name used by the writing partnership of D. Suresh and A.N. Balakrishnan, who write stories, detective novels and screenplays in  Tamil.

Work
The duo began co-authoring stories when they were in college together, and have been publishing their work since 1979. They have published more than 450 short novels and more than 400 short stories. Most of their detective novels feature the characters Narendran and Vaijayanthi of Eagle Eye Detective Agency, and their coworker John Sundar. Other characters created by Subha are Selva and Murugesan, who also feature in their detective stories, and John Sembaruthi, who is a character in some of Subha's novels set in the army.

They have also written screenplays and dialogues for Tamil films and television serials. The movies Kana Kandaen and Ayan were based on their published novels and were scripted by Subha together with director K. V. Anand. They co-authored the script for Ko, a political thriller movie, and Maatraan, a family thriller with K.V. Anand. The script for 180, a bilingual movie in Tamil and Telugu, was co-authored by Subha with director Jayendra. I (dialogues), Anegan, Yatchan, Thani oruvan were co-authored by Subha.

Suresh and Balakrishnan run their own publishing company, Thanga Thaamarai Publications, which, in addition to their novels, brings out some non-fiction titles.

Personal life
After college, Suresh and Balakrishnan both worked in banks, which they eventually quit in order to become full-time writers. They live with their families in adjacent apartments in Chennai.

Bibliography

Vaa Vennila  
Vettai Maan  
Sirikkum Penne
Thudikkum Ithayam 
Bhoomikku Puthiyavan
Aatta Nayagan
Vetri Pathai
Anbin Valimai
Accha Maligai
Therkku Roja
Marakkatha Nenjam
Puthirai Oru Punnagai
Ennai Vittu Pogathe
Bhoomiyil Maraithavan
Anbudan Un Adimai
Ithayathil Idam Kodu
Oru Chinna Puyal
Yuir Moochu
Kalaiyatha
Kanavu Rajjiyam
Nettraya Nila
Naayagi
Naan Venduma
Iraval Ithayam
Achcham Thavir
Ula Varum Nila
Ithaya Vaasal
En Peyar Aakash
Ethirigale
Anbulla Achchame
Panimalaiyil
Karuppu Seithi
Kuttram Purinthavan
Ulagai Vendravan
Kurukku Pathai
Bharathiyin Nithingale
Tholaintha Pakkangal
Ninaivil Oru Mayilliragu
Yaaro Ivar Yaaro
Kaatrodu Vaa
Meniyellam Siragugal
Kaatrodu Sila Kaladi Chuvadugal
Nenjinile Oru Nesa Thee
Neeyuma?
Nee Nee Neemattume
Innum Oru Kathali
Iruthi Yaththirai
Kadaisi Pournami
Karuppu Kaatru
Jeyuthu Konde Iruppen
Theerpu Naal
Nathikari Gnabagam
Ethir Kaatru
Aruge Oru Aabathu
Thoondil kayiru 
Kathirukiren  
Oru Thuli Ratham
Desathoroki

Filmography

See also
 List of Indian writers

References

Living people
Tamil-language writers
Tamil screenwriters
Indian male novelists
Screenwriters from Tamil Nadu
Indian screenwriting duos
Year of birth missing (living people)